Finding Fela is a 2014 documentary film by Oscar-winning director Alex Gibney, portraying and analysing the life of pioneering musician Fela Kuti. The film had its world premiere at the 2014 Sundance Film Festival on January 17, 2014.

Synopsis
A look at the life and music of Nigerian singer Fela Kuti, interwoven with extended scenes of the development of the New York musical Fela! and interviews with its director Bill T. Jones.

Reception
Finding Fela received mixed reviews from critics. Geoffrey Berkshire of Variety, said in his review: "This watchable but rather rote chronicle fails to find a compelling perspective on Kuti's significant life and legacy." David Rooney of The Hollywood Reporter praised the film by describing it as "An absorbing if not quite definitive patchwork of the life and legacy of an unorthodox artist."

Extracts from the film featured in the 2015 British Library exhibition West Africa: Word, Symbol, Song.

See also
List of films at the 2014 Sundance Film Festival

References

External links

 
 Official website

Documentary films about African music
2014 films
2014 documentary films
Films directed by Alex Gibney
Nigerian music
Documentary films about Nigeria
Documentary films about jazz music and musicians
Fela Kuti
2010s English-language films